Rectangular Octave Virginal is a 16th-century virginal in the style of Samuel Biedermann the Elder, probably made in Augsburg about 1600. It is in the collection of the Metropolitan Museum of Art.

Early history and creation
Little is known of the early history of this specific instrument. It was donated by Mary Elizabeth Adams Brown and is part of the Crosby Brown Collection of Musical Instruments gifted in 1889, where it is classified as a Chordophone-Zither-plucked-virginal. It is decorated with hand-painted engravings by Hans Sebald Beham and Crispijn van de Passe I.

Description and interpretation

The left engraving shows the return of Tobias, showing the scene where the angel Raphael from The Book of Tobit takes leave of old Tobit and Sarah before flying off into heaven (his flight can be seen through the window). Tobit seated next to his bride under the cloth of honor looks at the angel. The right engraving shows a scene from the Book of Daniel when a hand writes the prophecy on the wall during Belshazzar's feast (his murder can be seen in the background).

Later history and influence

The presence of the engravings helps to both date the piece as well as give a glimpse into the popular scenes from the bible after the Protestant Reformation.

See also
 Ottavini (singular form: Ottavino) — miniature virginals with octave higher pitch, produced by both Italian and northern schools.
 Double virginals — known as Mother and Child (moeder und kind), the instruments combined a normal virginal and ottavino, produced by Flemish school, in particular the Ruckers family.

References

Individual string instruments
Harpsichord
Collection of the Metropolitan Museum of Art